Liga 3 North Sumatra is a third level Indonesian football competition held by Asprov PSSI North Sumatra since 2017.
It is also a qualification to qualify for the Liga 3 National round

PSDS became the most successful team (3 title)

List of Champions

Results

Performances

References 

Liga 3 (Indonesia)
Sport in North Sumatra